Rong River may refer to:

Rong River (Guangdong), China
Rong River (Guangxi), China
Rong River (Tibet), China, a tributary of the Arun River

See also
Rong (disambiguation)
Ròn River, Vietnam